Bahuari Pidari is a village development committee in Parsa District in the Narayani Zone of southern Nepal. At the time of the 2011 Nepal census it had a population of 5,919 people living in 858 individual households. There were 3,142 males and 2,777 females at the time of census.

References

Populated places in Parsa District